The 1978 California Angels season involved the Angels finishing tied for second in the American League West with a record of 87 wins and 75 losses.

Late in the season, the Angels suffered the loss of outfielder Lyman Bostock when Bostock was murdered on September 23rd in Gary, Indiana.

Offseason 
 November 21, 1977: Lyman Bostock was signed as a free agent by the Angels.
 December 5, 1977: Bobby Bonds, Richard Dotson and Thad Bosley were traded by the Angels to the Chicago White Sox for Brian Downing, Chris Knapp, and Dave Frost.
 December 8, 1977: Jerry Remy was traded by the Angels to the Boston Red Sox for Don Aase and cash.
 January 15, 1978: Gary Nolan was released by the Angels.
 March 20, 1978: Fred Kuhaulua was released by the Angels.
 March 25, 1978: Merv Rettenmund was signed as a free agent by the Angels.

Regular season 
On May 12, Angels pitcher Nolan Ryan struck out Buddy Bell for the 2500th strikeout of his career.

Season standings

Record vs. opponents

Notable transactions 
 June 6, 1978: 1978 Major League Baseball draft
Dave Engle was drafted by the Angels in the 3rd round.
Dan Whitmer was drafted by the Angels in the 14th round.

Roster

Player stats

Batting

Starters by position 
Note: Pos = Position; G = Games played; AB = At bats; H = Hits; Avg. = Batting average; HR = Home runs; RBI = Runs batted in

Other batters 
Note: G = Games played; AB = At bats; H = Hits; Avg. = Batting average; HR = Home runs; RBI = Runs batted in

Pitching

Starting pitchers 
Note: G = Games pitched; IP = Innings pitched; W = Wins; L = Losses; ERA = Earned run average; SO = Strikeouts

Other pitchers 
Note: G = Games pitched; IP = Innings pitched; W = Wins; L = Losses; ERA = Earned run average; SO = Strikeouts

Relief pitchers 
Note: G = Games pitched; W = Wins; L = Losses; SV = Saves; ERA = Earned run average; SO = Strikeouts

Farm system 

LEAGUE CHAMPIONS: El Paso

Notes

References

External links 
1978 California Angels team at Baseball-Reference
1978 California Angels at Baseball Almanac

Los Angeles Angels seasons
California Angels season
Los